Miroslav Proft (9 December 1923 – 23 October 2011) was a Czech sports shooter. He competed in the 50 m pistol event at the 1952 Summer Olympics.

References

1923 births
2011 deaths
Czech male sport shooters
Olympic shooters of Czechoslovakia
Shooters at the 1952 Summer Olympics
Place of birth missing